The men's eight competition at the 2000 Summer Olympics in Sydney, Australia took place at the Sydney International Regatta Centre. It was held from 18 to 24 September. There were 9 boats (81 competitors) from 9 nations, with each nation limited to a single boat in the event. The event was won by Great Britain, the nation's first victory in the men's eight since back-to-back victories in 1908 and 1912; the three total gold medals was second-most among nations behind the United States (with 11). Australia took silver, while Croatia's debut in the men's eight was good for bronze.

Background

This was the 23rd appearance of the event. Rowing had been on the programme in 1896 but was cancelled due to bad weather. The men's eight has been held every time that rowing has been contested, beginning in 1900.

The United States had dominated the event for four decades from the 1920s to the 1950s, but had not won a gold medal at the Olympics since 1964, falling short as the favourites in 1988. The Americans were favoured again in 2000, having won the last three World Championships in 1997, 1998, and 1999. Reigning Olympic champions the Netherlands had not reached a podium since the 1996 Games. Germany was not present; German teams (including the United Team, East, and West) had taken medals at 9 of the past 10 Games.

Croatia made its debut in the event. The United States made its 20th appearance, most among nations to that point.

Competition format

This rowing event consisted of nine teams, split into two four- or five-team heats. The course used the 2000 metres distance that became the Olympic standard in 1912 (with the exception of 1948). Each team fielded a boat crewed by eight rowers and a coxswain. Each rower used a single oar, with four oars on each side of the boat. The winner of each heat qualified for the "Final A" (or medal) round. The remaining six teams competed in the repechage round, with the top four from that round qualifying for the "Final A" round. The last two teams in the repechage competed in the "Final B" round.

The final ranking for this event was based on the order of finish in the two finals. The top three of the "Final A" teams earned Olympic medals for placing first, second, and third, while the remaining "Final A" teams placed fourth through sixth, according to their "Final A" finish. The "Final B" competition determined the placement for the last three places (7–9) in the event's final ranking.

Schedule
All times are Australian Time (UTC+10)

Results

Semifinals

The winner of each heat advanced to the A Final, the remainders went to the repechage.

Semifinal 1

Semifinal 2

Repechage

The first two in each heat qualified for Final A, while the remainder went to Final B.

Repechage heat 1

Repechage heat 2

Finals

Final B

Final A

References

External links
Official Report of the 2000 Sydney Summer Olympics
Rowing Results

Rowing at the 2000 Summer Olympics
Men's events at the 2000 Summer Olympics